Like Water for Chocolate (Spanish: Como agua para chocolate) is a 1992 Mexican romantic drama film in the style of magical realism based on the debut novel of the same name published in 1989 by Mexican novelist Laura Esquivel. It earned ten Ariel Awards including the Best Picture and was nominated for a Golden Globe Award for Best Foreign Language Film. The film became the highest-grossing foreign-language film ever released in the United States at the time. The film was selected as the Mexican entry for the Best Foreign Language Film at the 65th Academy Awards, but was not accepted as a nominee.

Plot

A woman named Tita living in the early 1900s experiences the struggles of love, family dynamics and family tradition.

A young lady is cutting onions, expressing the influences of emotions and cooking. She begins a story with the birth of a girl named Tita. Tita's mother, Elena, gives birth on the kitchen table, assisted by the cook, Nacha. Shortly afterwards Elena's husband dies of a heart attack when a stranger viciously tells him that his wife had an affair and the second daughter isn't his. During the funeral Elena explains to Nacha that she can no longer have children and the family tradition dictates that Tita, being the youngest child, cannot marry but must take care of her mother until her death. Tita's sisters, Rosaura and Gertrudis, will be allowed to marry. Nacha takes charge of teaching Tita how to cook food in flavorful ways. Tita learns to infuse her emotions into food.

Years later a young man named Pedro Muzquiz professes his love and desire to marry Tita, who feels the same way about Pedro. On Tita's birthday, Pedro arrives with his father, Don Pascual Muzquiz, to ask for her hand. Elena explains why Tita is not allowed to marry and offers Rosaura instead. Rosaura is delighted, Tita is devastated and Gertrudis and Chencha (a maid) are disappointed. Nacha overhears Pedro tell his father that he is marrying Rosaura only in order to stay close to Tita. Nacha tells Tita but she is too upset to believe it. While cooking the wedding cake Tita cries into the batter. During the wedding reception Pedro tells Tita of his true feelings. Suspicious that Tita and Pedro are having an affair, Elena says Tita must stay away from Pedro. As the guests eat the wedding cake, everyone is overcome with great sadness for lost lovers and begins to cry, followed by vomiting. Overcome with this sadness Elena rushes to her bedroom and tearfully looks at the photo of a well-dressed mulatto man. It is implied that the rumours about Elena's affair are true. Tita finds Nacha dead on the floor holding a picture of her husband.

Some time later Rosaura becomes pregnant. One day Pedro brings Tita a bouquet of roses to celebrate Tita being the head cook. Elena commands Tita to throw them away but Tita uses the petals to create a rose sauce for a quail dish. While eating the meal everyone except Rosaura becomes filled with sensual gratification. Rosaura is sick instead and leaves the table. Gertrudis becomes hot and so overheated that the shower house catches fire. She runs away naked, encountering the soldier Juan Alejandrez, who is fighting in the Mexican Revolution. Filled with a strong attraction to Juan, Gertrudis immediately jumps onto his horse and leaves with him. Tita sees this but tells Elena that Gertrudis was kidnapped and the soldiers set the shower house on fire. Elena is informed by a family priest that Gertrudis was forced into prostitution. Tita secretly sends Gertrudis her things.

Rosaura gives birth to a sickly son, Roberto. Too ill to nurse Roberto, she must let Tita nurse him with Pedro monitoring. Still suspicious that Tita and Pedro are having an affair, Elena sends Rosaura, Pedro and Roberto to live in Texas. Months later Chencha informs Elena and Tita that Roberto, unwilling to eat, has died. Tita is greatly saddened, but Elena tells her to show no emotion and to continue with the kitchen chores. This brings Tita to an angry outburst and Elena slapping her with a wooden spoon, resulting in a nose bleed. Tita runs into the dovecote and Elena threatens to have the ladder taken down.

For Tita, her rite of separation is the physical removal of her person from Elena’s oppressive domination and into the dovecote, where she inhabits a state of nothingness for a period of seven days. After a week of being in the dovecote, Tita is rescued by John Brown, a family doctor, who takes her to his home in Texas for treatment. Tita’s rite of transition occurs with this rescue by Dr. Brown, where she eats the healing soup he has made for her and learns of the tunnel of light that she later encounters at the end of the film. Chencha goes to visit Tita and is shocked that she has recovered. Tita tells Chencha to tell Elena that she is never coming back to the ranch. Doctor Brown, who has fallen in love with Tita, proposes marriage and Tita accepts.

Back at the ranch, a group of bandits invade the property, rape Chencha and kill Elena by pushing her off a cliff. Tita and Doctor Brown return to the ranch to prepare Elena's funeral. While dressing Elena's body, Tita discovers the locket and jewelry box containing the picture of Elena's lover. Tita’s rite of incorporation occurs when she returns back to the ranch with her new found freedom from Elena, where she discovers the locket her mother had been hiding, which contained pictures of another man. Pedro and Rosaura, now pregnant again, return for Elena's funeral, and Rosaura's water breaks. Rosaura has a difficult labor but gives birth to a healthy baby girl named Esperanza. However, Esperanza refuses to be fed by Rosaura, so Tita once again takes on the duties of nursing. Due to complications in childbirth, Rosaura is no longer able to bear children. To Tita and Pedro's dismay, Rosaura imposes the family tradition on Esperanza. Upon finding out about Tita's engagement to Doctor Brown, Pedro becomes jealous, and he sneaks into Tita's room to have sex with her.

During a large social dinner Gertrudis, now a military General, returns to the ranch with Juan Alejandrez, now her husband, along with their squad. Due to her guilt Tita begins to have illusions of Elena chastising her for sleeping with Pedro. Tita suspects that she is pregnant with Pedro's child, and tells Gertrudis her concerns. Gertrudis advises Tita to tell Pedro. Gertrudis reminds Tita that the love she and Pedro share is true and that Rosaura's feelings are irrelevant because she knew that Tita was in love with Pedro but married him anyway. Tita is once again confronted with an illusion of Elena berating her. This time Tita stands up to Elena, confronting her about her affair and then banishing her. While singing up to Tita's window with Juan, Pedro catches on fire. Tita treats Pedro's wounds until Doctor Brown shows up. Pedro, still jealous of Tita's engagement with Doctor Brown, wants her to break it off and threatens to tell Doctor Brown about their one-night stand and her pregnancy. Tita tells Pedro she's not pregnant; it was a false alarm. However, out of guilt, Tita tells Doctor Brown of her infidelity and apologizes for hurting him. Doctor Brown accepts her apology and states that he still wants to be with her, but he will accept whatever decision she makes of their relationship. Rosaura confronts Tita about her relationship with Pedro. Rosaura threatens to kick Tita off the ranch if she goes anywhere near her daughter Esperanza, and dictates that Esperanza will never marry per family tradition.

Many years later, Esperanza marries Doctor Brown's son. It is revealed through gossip that Tita stayed on the ranch to fight for Esperanza's right to marry and Pedro woke up to find Rosaura dead from an unknown gastro-intestinal illness, releasing Esperanza from the family tradition.

Pedro tells Tita that, with Esperanza married off, they can rekindle their romance. After the wedding they both go to the guest house to make love. While having sex, Pedro has a heart attack and dies. Devastated, Tita commits suicide by swallowing matches, causing her body to spontaneously combust and the room to catch on fire, which spreads throughout the entire property.

The young woman narrating the whole story reveals that she is the daughter of Esperanza. She reveals that when Esperanza returned home from her honeymoon to find the property burned to ashes, she discovered Tita's cook book, which she kept and passed down to her daughter.

Characters
Lumi Cavazos as Tita
Marco Leonardi as Pedro
Regina Torné as Mama Elena
Mario Iván Martínez as Doctor John Brown
Ada Carrasco as Nacha
Yareli Arizmendi as Rosaura
Claudette Maillé as Gertrudis
Pilar Aranda as Chencha
Farnesio de Bernal as Cura
Joaquín Garrido as Sargento Treviño
Rodolfo Arias as Juan Alejándrez
Margarita Isabel as Paquita Lobo
Sandra Arau as Esperanza Muzquiz
Andrés García Jr as Alex Brown
Regino Herrera as Nicolás
Genaro Aguirre as Rosalio
David Ostrosky as Juan de la Garza
Brígida Alexander as Tia Mary
Amado Ramírez as Pedro's father
Arcelia Ramírez as Esperanza's daughter
Socorro Rodríguez as friend of Paquita

Themes

Gender 
Differing gender roles and values are central to the de la Garza family. The film complicates the roles that tradition expects Tita, Getrudis, and Rosaura to play.  Tita, a maternal caretaker, breaks tradition; Gertrudis embodies the duality of the male and the female; and Rosaura, an upholder of the traditional female role, fails to fulfill it. Rosaura strives to be a traditional female matron. She marries her sister Tita's one true love Pedro and adopts the role of wife. Her primary duties are to cook, to clean, and to take care of her children. The problem is that  she cannot cook, cannot clean, and cannot nurse her own baby. Next to bend her gender is Gertrudis, offspring of an illicit affair between Mama Elena and her paramour. We know from early on that Gertrudis does not fit the ladylike mold. She is a tomboy, openly disagreeing with her mother and her traditional values. She encourages Tita to court Pedro even though he is married to their sister. When Tita's emotions enter into the rose petal dish she serves the family for dinner, Gertrudis eats and becomes so aroused that her body begins to steam. She runs to the outhouse, her heat setting it on fire, and departs home on the back of a horse ridden by a soldier of the Mexican Revolution. When Gertrudis mysteriously returns one night, we learn that she is a soldier fighting in the Revolution. Married to the man on the horse, she now commands her husband's troops. Tita is her sisters’ opposite.  She is a caretaker and family cook. Everyone loves her cooking and Tita miraculously serves as nursemaid to Rosaura's baby, since Rosaura is unable to produce milk. (When Pedro and Rosaura move away, the baby dies because Rosaura could not nurse it.) The differing gender roles give each character depth and significance, highlighting the opposites at work in each sister. In doing so the film displays strong women breaking barriers and redefining what it means to be a female.

Tradition 
Tradition is central to this movie. Tita, Gertrudis and the Mexican Revolution itself all fight against it. The movie's main conflict is a family tradition which forbids the youngest daughter from marrying so that she will be free to take care of her mother. This requirement sets up a battle between Tita and her mother, Mama Elena. Tita struggles to live her own life; Mama Elena fights to keep Tita at home. So fierce is Mama Elena's desire to uphold tradition that she orders her oldest daughter, Rosaura, to marry Pedro, Tita's one true love. Gertrudis, the middle child and offspring of an illicit affair between Mama Elena and her lover, runs away from home and joins the people fighting to end the dictatorship and corruption afflicting the common folk of Mexico. Tired of the tradition that only the wealthy landowners had wealth and power, the people revolted, fighting for the workers of the land. Gertrudis' battle against the government parallels the battle between Tita and Elena. Both fight for change. In the war Gertrudis becomes a leader of an all-male rebel group. The men both listen and respect her. Gertrudis challenges tradition and becomes a successful leader. Tita's challenge to tradition will also be successful and portends successful change for Mexico.

On the other hand, while tradition serves well to help pass down a family's customs or even cultural customs, often tradition can be viewed negatively and tear families and society apart because of how it can mistreat those in society who deviate from tradition. Mexican culture has in fact long expressed this coerced marriage rule in which women's opinions are left unconsidered, and as a result these traditions lead to the mistreatment of women. This mistreatment also happens in the de la Garza family where the family tradition prevents the main character, Tita, from marrying Pedro due to the rule that the youngest daughter must not marry. Thus, breaking this specific tradition is a main theme within the film. One way this is represented in the film is through the character of Mama Elena as her oppressive and tyrannical force to Tita. Her character displays how corruptive traditions such as forced marriage hinder others and tear groups apart, as Mama Elena does to Tita to prevent her from marrying Pedro. However, with the help of Tita's magical cooking that eventually breaks the family free from tradition, Tita and her sister, Gertrudis, not only break barriers and the gender roles in their society, but also help establish a tradition to start treating each other equally.

Filming locations
 Ciudad Acuña, Mexico
 Eagle Pass, Texas
 Piedras Negras, Coahuila, Mexico
 Del Rio, Texas

Reception
Like Water for Chocolate received critical acclaim from critics. On review aggregator website Rotten Tomatoes, the film holds an approval rating of 87%, based on 46 reviews, and an average rating of 7.56/10. On Metacritic, it has a score of 86 out of 100 based on 18 critics, indicating "universal acclaim".

The American release of this film is quite shorter than the original Mexican version. In the original release, you see the main character Tita return home to take care of her dying mother; in the American release, this complete sequence is removed and instead Tita only returns home for her mother's funeral.

The film became the highest-grossing foreign-language film ever released in the United States and Canada at the time with a gross of $21.6 million, surpassing the previous record of $20.2 million set by I Am Curious (Yellow) released in 1969.

Year-end lists 
 6th – Dan Craft, The Pantagraph

Awards

Ariel Awards
The Ariel Awards are awarded annually by the Mexican Academy of Film Arts and Sciences in Mexico. Como agua para chocolate received ten awards out of 14 nominations.

|-
|rowspan="14" scope="row"| 1992
|scope="row"| Como Agua Para Chocolate
|scope="row"| Best Picture
| 
|-
|scope="row"| Alfonso Arau
|rowspan="1" scope="row"| Best Director
| 
|-
|scope="row"| Mario Iván Martínez
|rowspan="1" scope="row"| Best Actor
| 
|-
|scope="row"| Regina Torné
|rowspan="2" scope="row"| Best Actress
| 
|-
|scope="row"| Lumi Cavazos
| 
|-
|scope="row"| Claudette Maillé
|rowspan="2" scope="row"| Best Supporting Actress
| 
|-
|scope="row"| Pilar Aranda
| 
|-
|scope="row"| Joaquín Garrido
|rowspan="1" scope="row"| Best Actor in a Minor Role
| 
|-
|scope="row"| Margarita Isabel
|rowspan="1" scope="row"| Best Actress in a Minor Role
| 
|-
|rowspan="1" scope="row"| Laura Esquivel
|rowspan="1" scope="row"| Best Screenplay
| 
|-
|scope="row"| Emmanuel Lubezki
|rowspan="1" scope="row"| Best Cinematography
| 

|-
|scope="row"| Carlos Bolado and Francisco Chiú
|rowspan="1" scope="row"| Best Editing
| 
|-
|rowspan="1" scope="row"| Emilio Mendoza, Gonzalo Ceja and Ricardo Mendoza
|rowspan="1" scope="row"| Best Production Design
| 
|-
|rowspan="1" scope="row"| Marco Antonio Arteaga, Carlos Brown, Mauricio De Aguinaco and Denise Pizzini
|rowspan="1" scope="row"| Best Set Design
| 
|-

Golden Globe Awards

|-
|rowspan="1" scope="row"| 1992
|scope="row"| Como Agua Para Chocolate
|scope="row"| Best Foreign Language Film
| 
|-

See also
 List of submissions to the 65th Academy Awards for Best Foreign Language Film
 List of Mexican submissions for the Academy Award for Best Foreign Language Film

References

External links
 

1992 films
Mexican romantic drama films
1990s Spanish-language films
1992 drama films
Best Picture Ariel Award winners
Films based on Mexican novels
Films set in Mexico
Cooking films
Miramax films
Magic realism films
Films directed by Alfonso Arau
Films about sisters
1990s Mexican films